George Gilman (1826–1901) was an American businessman, founder of the A&P.

George Gilman may also refer to:

George Gilman (Oregon politician), American politician in Oregon's State House of Representatives
George G. Gilman, pseudonym of British author Terry Harknett

See also
George Gilman Fogg (1813–1881), United States Senator and diplomat from New Hampshire
George Gilman Rushby (1900–1968), elephant hunter